Riley and the Roxies is a solo project by recording artist and producer Spencer Riley Alfonso, who is known simply as Spencer Riley. It was created in 2011 in Los Angeles, California, during Riley's first two years of college, where he developed a love for producing, mixing, and recording music. His music has been featured in various television shows including ABC Family's Pretty Little Liars, and MTV's Underemployed.

History

Early years 
Riley's interest in music began in fourth grade when he started to play the drums with his friends. In high school, Riley originally headed a band called Riley. The band's name was later changed to Riley and the Roxies, based on the Roxy Theatre in Los Angeles, California, where the band used to play. When the band disbanded as its members departed for college, Riley kept the name as he constantly collaborates with new back-up singers.

Apart from his work as Riley and the Roxies, Spencer Riley has also co-written songs with Trent Dabbs, Jules Larson, Mariah McManus, Pilar Diaz, Bess Rogers, and Wes Period.

2013-present 
As of 2013, Riley and the Roxies has signed to Secret Road Music Services, a music agency that is behind the careers of musicians like Ingrid Michaelson and The Civil Wars.

Musical styles and influences 
Riley and the Roxies has been said to be described as a cross between California and New York rock and roll, drawing inspiration ranging from 1960's garage rock, to Motown, as well as the roots rockers of the late 1970s and early 1980s. Among the acts cited by Spencer Riley as musical influences are Elvis Costello, Prince, and Bruce Springsteen.

Riley has also produced and directed seventeen music videos since the inception of the project, developing a community of filmmakers and actors dedicated to the production of Riley and the Roxies' music videos.

Discography 

 Lola - EP (2013)
 A Winter Romance - EP (2011)
 OceanGold - EP (2011)
 The Lovers in Spain - EP (2011)

References

External links 
 Riley and the Roxies on Youtube
 Riley and the Roxies on Facebook
 Riley and the Roxies on Twitter
 Riley and the Roxies' discography

American indie rock musicians
Living people
Musicians from Los Angeles
Year of birth missing (living people)